Maja Jelčić (born 20 July 2004) is a Bosnian footballer who plays as a forward for SFK 2000 and the Bosnia and Herzegovina women's national team.

International goals

References

2004 births
Living people
Bosnia and Herzegovina women's footballers
Women's association football forwards
Bosnia and Herzegovina women's international footballers